Robert Echlin may refer to:
 Robert Echlin (bishop), Church of Ireland bishop
 Robert Echlin (British Army officer), Member of Parliament, grandson of the preceding
 Robert Echlin (1674–1706), Member of Parliament, nephew of the preceding
 Sir Robert Echlin, 2nd Baronet (1699–1757), son of the preceding